Korath the Pursuer (real name Korath-Thak) is a fictional character appearing in American comic books published by Marvel Comics. Korath was a geneticist, who founded and led the Pursuer Project. He also was a member of the Starforce.

Djimon Hounsou portrayed the character in the Marvel Cinematic Universe films Guardians of the Galaxy (2014), Captain Marvel (2019), and the Disney+ series What If...? (2021).

Publication history
Korath first appeared in Quasar #32 (March 1992), and was created by Mark Gruenwald and Greg Capullo. It was revealed that Korath-Thak was the lead designer of the project that created the Pursuer, a cockroach from Earth modified by Kree geneticists, which first appeared in The Inhumans #11 (June 1977), fifteen years before Korath himself made his first appearance.

He was a member of the Starforce team during the Operation Galactic Storm storyline. He turned the experiments on himself and it give him superpowers, including the ability to follow the brainwaves of his targets. He later reunited with his old team mate Ronan the Accuser, as part of the Annihilation event.

Fictional character biography
Korath-Thak is an agent of the Kree Empire. He was a cyber-geneticist, and the founder and head of the Pursuer Project to develop cybernetic warriors for the Kree militia. He has also been a munitions manufacturing plant foreman, and a special operative of the Supreme Intelligence.

Korath used cyber-genetic technology of his own design to gain superhuman powers during the Kree/Shi'ar War. He then met Shatterax, Ultimus, and Supremor. At the behest of Supremor, he attacked the Avengers force on Hala, and battled Captain America. Alongside the Kree Starforce, he again battled the Avengers on Hala. He witnessed the assassination of Ael-Dan and Dar-Benn by Deathbird and the return to power of the Supreme Intelligence. Alongside the Kree Starforce, he was held captive in a Shi'ar stasis ray. He witnessed a battle between an Avengers force, and was defeated by the Scarlet Witch and Astra. Alongside the Kree Starforce, he arrived in the Shi'ar Empire to assassinate Lilandra. He battled another contingent of Avengers and the Shi'ar Imperial Guard. He returned to Hala alongside Lilandra, Starforce, and the Imperial Guard after the detonation of the nega-bomb to help the Kree rebuild under Shi'ar rule. Alongside the Shi'ar Starforce and Deathbird, Korath attacked Quasar, Her, and Makkari on Hala for violating Shi'ar airspace.

Admiral Galen-Kor and his criminal forces battled Deathbird and Starforce. Korath and Starforce alongside the Underground Legion battled Lord Tantalus. Korath wound up settling on the planet of Godthab Omega. Korath was reunited with Ronan when he came to the planet in search of Tana Nile. Korath was apparently assimilated into The Phalanx and became one of their Select. He fought Quasar, Moondragon, and Adam Warlock and was killed by Ultron when he failed to capture Adam Warlock. Tanalth became the new leader of the Pursuer Corps.

Powers and abilities
Korath is a member of the alien Kree race, who was augmented by an unknown experimental cyber-genetic engineering process. He has superhuman strength, stamina, and durability. He also has the ability to psionically locate individuals by tracing their brain patterns. Like other Kree, Korath is unable to breathe in Earth's atmosphere without a special apparatus or breathing serum.

Korath is an expert in cyber-genetic engineering. He is trained in the martial skills of the ancient Kree, and is a competent but relatively inexperienced armed and unarmed combatant.

Korath wears an armored battle-suit and helmet composed of unknown alien materials. He wields two 1½ foot beta-batons which generate electrical force capable of stunning opponents into unconsciousness on contact or disrupting functions of electrical devices. By adjusting the batons, Korath can stun beings as powerful as Eternals or even intangible beings. He is capable of flight via electrically powered turbines in his boots.

In other media

Marvel Cinematic Universe
Djimon Hounsou portrays Korath in media set in the Marvel Cinematic Universe (MCU).
 Korath first appears in the live-action film Guardians of the Galaxy (2014). A subordinate of Ronan the Accuser, he travels to the planet Morag to retrieve an orb that was stolen by Star-Lord. After Ronan recovers the orb and takes the Infinity Stone within it for himself, Korath assists him in his siege on the planet Xandar. Korath battles the Guardians of the Galaxy when they attempt to foil Ronan's plans, only to be killed by Drax the Destroyer.
 A younger Korath appears in the live-action film Captain Marvel (2019), which is set before Guardians of the Galaxy. He is shown to be a member of Starforce alongside Carol Danvers and Yon-Rogg. Korath and Starforce set out to find a compromised Kree scout, only to be ambushed by a faction of Skrulls. Danvers is captured, but she escapes to Earth and contacts Yon-Rogg. Korath and Starforce accompany him to Earth to confront Danvers, only to be defeated by her.
 Hounsou voices an alternate timeline version of Korath in the Disney+ animated series, What If...? episode "What If... T'Challa Became a Star-Lord?". This version is more sympathetic and heroic than his film counterpart and joins the Ravagers following an encounter with Star-Lord T'Challa, of whom Korath is a fan.

Television
A variation of Korath based on the MCU version appears in the Guardians of the Galaxy animated series episodes "Backstabbers" and "Road to Knowhere," voiced by Dave Fennoy. This version is a minion and adopted son of Thanos who was raised alongside Gamora and Nebula.

Video games
 Korath appears as a playable character in the 1995 arcade game Avengers in Galactic Storm. 
 Korath appears in Marvel: Avengers Alliance 2.

References

External links
 Korath at Marvel.com
 
 

Characters created by Greg Capullo
Characters created by Mark Gruenwald
Comics characters introduced in 1992
Fictional characters with superhuman durability or invulnerability
Fictional stick-fighters
Kree
Marvel Comics aliens
Marvel Comics characters with superhuman strength
Marvel Comics extraterrestrial supervillains
Marvel Comics supervillains
Superhero film characters